Adventdalen is a  valley that is the broader term for Adventdalselva (Advent Valley River) on the island Spitsbergen in Svalbard, Norway. The valley and the river flow into Adventfjorden and further into Isfjorden.

The end of the valley is at Haugen in Longyearbyen, close to the University Centre in Svalbard. The valley originates from the mountains Slottet and Tronfjellet, under the glaciers Hellefonna and Drønbreen. It runs westwards towards the fjord. From northwest, the branch valleys are: Mälardalen, Helvetiadalen, Eskerdalen, Janssondalen, Foxdalen, Bolterdalen, Todalen and Endalen.

On the south side of the valley are closed mines to which a road runs. Mine 7 is operational,  from Longyearbyen. The valley has snow scooter trails, and the valley has mobile telephone service. At its mouth was old Svalbard Airport; its new site opened in 1975 nearby.

References

Valleys of Spitsbergen
Longyearbyen